"Things That Make You Go Hmmm..." is a song by American dance group C+C Music Factory. It was released in June 1991 as the third single from their debut album, Gonna Make You Sweat (1990). The single features Freedom Williams and he is also seen in the accompanying music video. The song was inspired by a running gag on The Arsenio Hall Show, where Arsenio, while allegedly on a long drive, pondered certain thoughts and referred to them as "things that make you go hmmm...."

The C+C song was a success in the US, reaching number four on the Billboard Hot 100, number 31 on the Billboard Hot R&B Singles chart, and number 20 on the Top 40 Radio Monitor. It also reached number four on the UK Singles Chart. The song was certified gold by the RIAA on August 13, 1991, for sales of over 500,000 copies.

Critical reception
AllMusic editor Jose F. Promis noted that the song "took a phrase popularized by Arsenio Hall and made it into another cleverly infectious Top Ten smash." Larry Flick from Billboard wrote, "After forging a guitar-driven pop/hiphop sound that is being heavily copied by others, groove clique deftly sidesteps into James Brown-style funk territory. Rapper Freedom Williams tells amusing tales amid retro-horns and percussion." Penelope Layland from The Canberra Times stated that it is "the best track on the album", "with its clever, catchy lyrics and smooth beat." 

Dave Sholin from the Gavin Report commented that writers/producers Cole and Clivillés "have successfully crossbred a unique brand of rap and melody that's taken them on back-to-back trips into the Top Ten. This third entry maintains their infectious rhythm, strengthened by a title that will keep audiences hummmmin'." A reviewer from Music & Media wrote that "the secret behind the success of these dance/pop providers is the good hook in their songs. This time it's the saxophone part, which is repeated after each line."

Chart performance
"Things That Make You Go Hmmm..." proved to be a major hit on several continents and remains one of the group's most successful songs. It soared to the number-one position on both the Billboard Hot Dance/Club Play chart in the United States and the RPM Dance/Urban chart in Canada. In Europe, the single climbed into the top 10 in Finland, Ireland and the United Kingdom. In the latter, it peaked at number four in its fourth week at the UK Singles Chart, on July 21, 1991. Additionally, it was a top 20 hit on the UK Dance Singles Chart, as well as in the Netherlands, Sweden and Switzerland. In Oceania, "Things That Make You Go Hmmm..." hit number two and six in New Zealand and Australia. On the US Billboard Hot 100, it peaked at number four. The single was awarded with a gold record in the US, after 500,000 singles were sold there.

Music video
The accompanying music video for the song was directed by German director Marcus Nispel. It features silhouetted animation of dancers jumping and dancing in front of a white background, with a stage visible, but also in silhouette. The story of the song is also interpreted with black and gold cut-out animation.

Impact and legacy
Australian music channel Max included "Things That Make You Go Hmmm..." in their list of "1000 Greatest Songs of All Time" in 2013.

Track listings

 7-inch single, Europe
 "Things That Make You Go Hmmm...." (7-inch remix) – 4:10
 "Things That Make You Go Hmmm...." (LP version) – 5:22

 12-inch, US; CD maxi, Japan
 "Things That Make You Go Hmmmm..." (The Clivillés & Cole Pumped album mix) – 5:19
 "Things That Make You Go Hmmmm..." (The Clivillés & Cole Deep house mix) – 5:13
 "Things That Make You Go Hmmmm..." (The Clivillés & Cole classic house mix) – 7:05

 CD single, Australia
 "Things That Make You Go Hmmmm..." (LP version) – 5:24
 "Gonna Make You Sweat (Everybody Dance Now)" (Clivilles & Cole D.J's Choice mix) – 5:01
 "Here We Go" (The Cole/Clivilles house mix) – 7:45

 CD maxi, Europe
 "Things That Make You Go Hmmm..." (C&C Classic house mix) – 7:05
 "Things That Make You Go Hmmm..." (C&C Deep house mix) – 5:13
 "Things That Make You Go Hmmm..." (alt. radio mix 2) – 4:49

Charts and certifications

Weekly charts

Year-end charts

Certifications

Release history

In popular culture
British girl group Stooshe covered the song and released it in 2013 as a B-side to their single "Black Heart", under the title "Things That Make You Go Mmm". The single reached number three in the UK and number four in Scotland.

References

1990 songs
1991 singles
Black-and-white music videos
C+C Music Factory songs
Music videos directed by Marcus Nispel
Song recordings produced by Robert Clivillés
Songs written by Robert Clivillés